Tautra is an island in the municipality of Frosta in Trøndelag county, Norway. It is located in the Trondheimsfjord, just north of the city of Trondheim.

The island is located almost in the middle of the Trondheimsfjord, in the heartland of what once was the central area of the Vikings.  The remains of the medieval Tuterø Abbey, a Cistercian monastery, that was established here in 1207 and dissolved during the Protestant Reformation. The monastery was placed strategically, very close to the Frostating assembly site—the central law-making institution in this region of Norway. In that context, the Cistercian monks of Tautra monastery became a part of the nation-building in Norway.  In 2003, Queen Sonja laid the cornerstone of Tautra Abbey, a new Cistercian nunnery on the island.

A large part of the island and its surrounding water is designated as protected under the Ramsar Convention due to the rich bird life in the area. Now, there are organized professional guided tours for bird watching as well as about the nature and history on Tautra.

See also
List of islands of Norway

References

External links
 Tautra Abbey

Ramsar sites in Norway
Islands of Trøndelag
Frosta